Juventigulella is a genus of very small air-breathing land snails, terrestrial pulmonate gastropod mollusks in the family Streptaxidae.

Species 
Species within the  genus Juventigulella include:
 Juventigulella amboniensis (Tattersfield, 1998)
 Juventigulella cryptophora (Morelet, 1881)
 Juventigulella habibui (Tattersfield, 1998)
 Juventigulella kimbozae (Verdcourt, 2004)
 Juventigulella ngerezae Rowson, 2007
 Juventigulella peakei (van Bruggen, 1975)
 Juventigulella spinosa (Tattersfield, 1998)

References 

 Tattersfield, P. (1998). Three new species and a new subgenus of Gulella (Gastropoda: Streptaxidae) from Tanzania. Journal of Conchology, 36 (2): 31–41. London
 Bank, R. A. (2017). Classification of the Recent terrestrial Gastropoda of the World. Last update: July 16, 2017.

External links
 Rowson, B. (2010). Systematics and diversity of the Streptaxidae (Gastropoda: Stylommatophora). Ph.D. thesis, University of Wales, Cardiff. Pp. i–vii + 1–307.

 
Streptaxidae